Marymont (from French Mont de Marie - Mary's Hill) is one of the northern neighbourhoods of Warsaw, Poland, administratively a part of the boroughs of Żoliborz (Marymont-Potok) and Bielany (Marymont-Kaskada and Marymont-Ruda). Named after the queen of Poland Maria Kazimiera, wife of King John III Sobieski, it initially housed a small summer manor. In the 18th century, it became notable for the large number of windmills located there on the high escarpment of the Vistula. In the 19th century, the area became one of the favourite weekend resting places, joined with the city centre by boat communication and a horse tram. In the 1920s, parts of the neighbourhood were built-up with residential areas. The Marymont Warsaw Metro station opened here in December 2006.

References

See also 
 Marywil
 Kazanowski Palace
 Marie Casimire Louise de La Grange d'Arquien

Neighbourhoods of Bielany
Neighbourhoods of Żoliborz